Mansoorah (Punjabi) is a neighbourhood located within union council 117 (Hanjarwal) in Iqbal Tehsil of Lahore, Punjab, Pakistan. Mansoorah is the headquarters of the Jamaat-e-Islami Pakistan political party in Lahore. It  also a housing society with more 150 homes.

See also
 Jamaat-e-Islami Pakistan
 Sayyid Abul Ala Maududi
 Professor Ghafoor Ahmed

References

Iqbal Town, Lahore
Jamaat-e-Islami Pakistan